Julian Stöckner (born 16 March 1989) is a German former professional footballer who played as a centre-back.

Career
Stöckner was born in Rinteln.

He has played youth football for TuS Almena, TBV Lemgo and Arminia Bielefeld and senior football with Arminia Bielefeld II, TuS Dornberg and SV Lippstadt 08 before joining his current club, SC Verl in 2014. He became club captain at SC Verl in July 2019.

Stöckner retired in July, a month after extending his contract with SC Verl, to become a policeman.

References

External links
 
 

1989 births
Living people
German footballers
People from Rinteln
Footballers from Lower Saxony
Association football defenders
Arminia Bielefeld II players
TuS Dornberg players
SV Lippstadt 08 players
SC Verl players
3. Liga players
Regionalliga players
Oberliga (football) players